Erika Akaya (born 20 December 1990) is a Japanese field hockey player for the Japanese national team.

She participated at the 2018 Women's Hockey World Cup.

References

1990 births
Living people
Japanese female field hockey players
Female field hockey goalkeepers